Infobae is an online newspaper based in Miami, Florida, in the United States. It was launched in 2002 by businessman Daniel Hadad, with the original headquarters in Buenos Aires. Infobae has 450 staff journalists and more than a thousand stringers. The company expanded globally with local editions in New York City, Mexico City, Miami, Bogotá, São Paulo, Lima, and Madrid, all led by Marcos Stupenengo. The expansion increased Infobae's international audience, becoming one of the most read Spanish-language online newspapers worldwide.

Demographics
Infobae.com is primarily viewed in Spanish speaking countries: Latin America, Spain and the United States.

History

Notable columnists
Domingo Cavallo
Geovanny Vicente
Jaime Bayly
Reynaldo Sietecase

Censorship in Venezuela
On 10 October 2014, the Venezuelan government under President Nicolás Maduro censored Infobae in Venezuela due to the publication of photos of the corpse of the recently murdered PSUV member Robert Serra saying it was against Venezuelan law, constituted psychological warfare and was dishonorable to Serra and his family.

Infobae responded by accusing the Maduro government of practicing a double standard since the Venezuelan government publishes photos of dead Palestinian children in order to accuse Israel of war crimes.

See also
Censorship in Venezuela

References

External links

2002 establishments in Argentina
Spanish-language websites
Argentine news websites